Vickie Gates is a British actress, best known for the roles of Leanne Powell in Brookside and Marilyn Chambers in The Bill. Between her initial stint as Leanne in 1993 and her return in 1997 (before a permanent return in 2000), Gates was in an all-girl pop band called Dream Reality. She has also appeared in the TV series Springhill, City Central and Liverpool 1.

She has supplemented her television work with appearances in the film The Last Straw and appearing in the Vagina Monologues. Other TV appearances have included Abbamania 2 and as the winner of Celebrity Stars in Their Eyes for ITV. In 2013, she played Pat in the BBC comedy-drama Being Eileen.

Acting credits

Screen roles

Stage roles

References

External links
 

British television actresses
British pop singers
British film actresses
Living people
1974 births
Actresses from Liverpool
British soap opera actresses
21st-century British singers
21st-century English women
21st-century English people